Runar Steinstad (born 4 June 1967) is a Paralympian athlete from Norway competing mainly in F42 classification throwing events.

Athletics history
Steinstad first represented Norway at the 2000 Summer Paralympics in Sydney, entering the long jump, 100 metre sprint and javelin throw events (F42). In the subsequent Paralympics after Sydney, Steinstad dropped the long jump and sprint events and focused on the javelin. He competed at both the 2004 Summer Paralympics in Athens and the 2008 Summer Paralympics in Beijing, finishing in the javelin sixth and tenth respectively. Paralympic success came in the 2012 Games in London, where he threw a distance of 48.90 to claim the bronze medal.

As well as his Paralympic appearances, Steinstad has also been part of six Norwegian teams to compete at the IPC Athletics World Championships, beginning in Birmingham, England in 1998 and has successfully qualified for the subsequent five games, taking him up to Doha in 2015. At the World Championships he has won a silver and two bronze medals, all in the javelin throw.

Personal history
Steinstad was born in Bø, Norway in 1967. Whilst a teenager, Steinstad was diagnosed with osteosarcoma (bone cancer). His left leg was amputated above the knee to treat the disease.

Notes

Paralympic athletes of Norway
Athletes (track and field) at the 2000 Summer Paralympics
Athletes (track and field) at the 2004 Summer Paralympics
Athletes (track and field) at the 2008 Summer Paralympics
Athletes (track and field) at the 2012 Summer Paralympics
Athletes (track and field) at the 2016 Summer Paralympics
Paralympic bronze medalists for Norway
Living people
Medalists at the 2012 Summer Paralympics
Norwegian male sprinters
Norwegian male javelin throwers
Norwegian male long jumpers
1967 births
People from Bø, Telemark
Paralympic medalists in athletics (track and field)
Sportspeople from Vestfold og Telemark
Sprinters with limb difference
Javelin throwers with limb difference
Long jumpers with limb difference
Paralympic sprinters
Paralympic javelin throwers
Paralympic long jumpers
21st-century Norwegian people